Pupelde Airport is an airport serving Ancud, a Pacific port city in the Los Lagos Region of Chile. Ancud is on the northern shore of Chiloé Island.

See also

Transport in Chile
List of airports in Chile

References

External links
Pupelde Airport at OpenStreetMap
Pupelde Airport at OurAirports

Pupelde Airport at FallingRain

Airports in Chile
Airports in Chiloé Archipelago